Purnima Choudhary (born 15 October 1971 in Calcutta, West Bengal) is a former One Day International cricketer who represented India. She is a right-hand batsman and bowls right-arm medium pace. She has played five ODIs for India and scored twenty runs, and took six wickets including a five-wicket haul on debut.

References

1971 births
India women One Day International cricketers
Indian women cricketers
Living people
Railways women cricketers